Reach is the eighth studio album by rock band Survivor, released under Frontiers Records on 25 April 2006. This is the band's first album in 18 years. Some of the material originates from a period from 1993 to 1996 when the band recorded demos for an unreleased album that can be heard on the Fire Makes Steel bootleg.

By this time, Frankie Sullivan was the only original member of Survivor, as Jim Peterik left the band in 1996. Following the release of this album singer Jimi Jamison left Survivor as well, though he subsequently reunited with them in 2011. Ultimately, this turned out to be his final album with the band, due to his death in 2014.

Track listing

Personnel 
Survivor
 Jimi Jamison – lead vocals (1, 2, 4-7, 9-12), backing vocals
 Chris Grove – keyboards
 Frankie Sullivan – guitars, backing vocals, lead vocals (3, 10)
 Barry Dunaway – bass (1, 3, 5, 7, 8, 10-12)
 Marc Droubay – drums

Additional musicians
 Kim Bullard – keyboards, bass and programming (4)
 Randy Riley – bass (2, 4, 6)
 Mark Christian – bass (4, 9)

Production 
 Frankie Sullivan – producer 
 Phil Bonanno – engineer
 Tim LeBlanc – engineer, mixing 
 Chris Steinmetz – engineer
 Andy Hayes – assistant engineer
 Sangwook Nam – mastering
 Doug Sax – mastering 
 Ioannis – art direction, design, artwork 
 Alex Solca – band photography

Studios
 Recorded at Track Record Studios (North Hollywood, California) and Chicago Recording Company (Chicago, Illinois).
 Mixed at Track Record Studios
 Mastered at The Mastering Lab (Hollywood, California).

References

2006 albums
Survivor (band) albums
Frontiers Records albums